Julio Alsogaray may refer to:

 Julio Rodolfo Alsogaray (1918–1994), Argentine Army general
 Julio Alsogaray (sailor) (born 1980), Argentine sailor